These are the United States Billboard Hot Dance Club Play and Singles Sales number-one hits of 2013.

See also
List of number-one Dance/Mix Show Airplay hits of 2013 (U.S.)
List of number-one Dance/Electronic Songs of 2013 (U.S.)
Dance/Electronic Digital Song Sales
List of artists who reached number one on the U.S. dance chart
2013 in music

References

United States Dance
2013
2013 in American music